Oedopeza is a genus of beetles in the family Cerambycidae, containing the following species:

 Oedopeza apicale (Gilmour, 1962)
 Oedopeza costulata (Gilmour, 1962)
 Oedopeza cryptica Monné, 1990
 Oedopeza flavosparsa Monné, 1990
 Oedopeza fleutiauxi (Villiers, 1980)
 Oedopeza guttigera Bates, 1864
 Oedopeza leucostigma Bates, 1864
 Oedopeza louisi Audureau, 2010
 Oedopeza maculatissima Monné & Martins, 1976
 Oedopeza ocellator (Fabricius, 1801)
 Oedopeza setigera (Bates, 1864)
 Oedopeza umbrosa (Germar, 1824)

References

Acanthocinini